2007 China Open can refer to:
2007 China Open (tennis), a tennis tournament
2007 China Open Super Series, a badminton tournament
China Open 2007 (snooker), a snooker tournament